The Mississippi High School Activities Association (MHSAA) is the official sanctioning body of all public and some private junior high and high school academic and athletic competitions in the state of Mississippi. It is a non-profit organization and is headquartered in Clinton, Mississippi. The MHSAA is a member of the National Federation of State High School Associations (NFHS).

Responsibilities
The activities which the MHSAA oversees include chess, esports, debate, drama, speech, writing-prose, poetry, short stories, essays and music, both band and choral.

The athletic competitions of which the MHSAA oversees include archery, football, swimming, slowpitch softball, volleyball, cross country, soccer, basketball, powerlifting, tennis, golf, track, baseball and fastpitch softball.

The MHSAA state football championship games are contested in early December. The site alternates between Vaught–Hemingway Stadium in Oxford, Davis Wade Stadium in Starkville and M.M. Roberts Stadium in Hattiesburg, Mississippi.

Classification

The MHSAA is currently divided into six classes. Enrollment is usually based on numbers from the Mississippi Department of Education. These numbers are considered official for classification purposes over a two-year period. For example, enrollment numbers submitted in 2016 would be used for the 2017–18 and 2018–19 school years. The largest 32 schools in the enrollment list are usually represented as Class 6A, the next 32 largest is considered Class 5A. Classes 4A, 3A and 2A are divided evenly in terms of number of schools. The remaining schools, usually those that have a student enrollment of 200 or less, would be Class 1A.

On April 7, 2022, it was announced that the MHSAA will add a 7th classification starting for the 2023-24 school year. Under the new system, the top 24 schools in terms of enrollment as per the Mississippi Department of Education will be in the new 7A classification. The next 24 schools will be 6A and the next 24 schools after that will make up the 5A classification. Classes 4A, 3A, and 2A are to have 40 schools apiece while the remaining schools will be under Class 1A. The reason for the change was that, according to MHSAA director Rickey Neaves, there is an almost 1,000-student gulf between Tupelo High School, whom has 1,907 students as per the 2021-23 enrollment numbers and is currently the largest school in the 6A classification, and Center Hill High School, whom has 1,047 students and is the smallest 6A school. Neaves also said that by adding a Class 7A, the student gulf between classifications would be shortened significantly.

See also
Mississippi Association of Independent Schools

References

External links
Official web site

High school sports associations in the United States
High school sports in Mississippi